The death of Jesus refers to the crucifixion of Jesus.

The Death of Jesus may also refer to:

The Death of Jesus (novel), a 2019 novel by J. M. Coetzee
The Death of Jesus : with "a new view," Constituting a Fundamental Revision of the History of the Origins of Christianity, a historical work by Joel Carmichael